Alex Segal (July 1, 1915 – August 22, 1977) was an American television director, television producer, and film director.

Segal directed more than 25 different television programs, including The United States Steel Hour and  Celanese Theater (1951–52), between his debut as a director on Starring Boris Karloff (1949) and his death in 1977. Segal directed some films, including Joy in the Morning in 1965.

He received several Emmy nominations for his directing in the 1950s and won a Primetime Emmy for his TV directorship of Death of a Salesman in 1966.

Segal also served as chairman of the Division of Drama at the University of Southern California from 1971 to 1976.

Filmography

As director

As producer
Celanese Theatre (1951-1952; 15 episodes)
Producers' Showcase (1956; 3 episodes)
No Time for Sergeants (1958)

References

External links 

1915 births
1977 deaths
American television directors
20th-century American businesspeople
American television producers